This is a list of reservoirs in Derbyshire, England, arranged in order of capacity.

See also 

 List of reservoirs in the Peak District
 List of dams and reservoirs in the United Kingdom

References 

 
Lakes of Derbyshire
reservoirs_in_Derbyshire